Samyda is a genus of plants in family Salicaceae. There are 11 species, chiefly shrubs of the West Indies.

The calyx is quinquepartite and coloured, there is no corolla.

Species 
 Samyda campanulata A. Borhidi & O. Muniz
 Samyda cubensis P. Wilson
 Samyda dodecandra Jacq.
 Samyda glabrata Sw.
 Samyda macrantha P. Wilson
 Samyda mexicana Rose
 Samyda ramosissima (Griseb.) J. E. Gut.
 Samyda spinulosa Vent. 
 Samyda subintegra A. Borhidi & O. Muniz 
 Samyda villosa Sw. 
 Samyda yucatanensis Standl.

References

 
Salicaceae genera
Taxa named by Nikolaus Joseph von Jacquin
Taxonomy articles created by Polbot